Hostel is a 2022 Indian Tamil-language comedy horror film directed by Sumanth Radhakrishnan and produced by Trident Arts. The film is a remake of the 2015 Malayalam film Adi Kapyare Kootamani co-written and directed by John Varghese. The film stars Ashok Selvan and Priya Bhavani Shankar with a supporting cast including Sathish, Nassar and Munishkanth. The film's music is composed by Bobo Shashi, with cinematography handled by Praveen Kumar and editing done by Ragul.  The film was released in theatres on 28 April 2022.

Synopsis
Adhirshtalakshmi encounters Kathir in the park and realizes that he is hit by financial issues. She offers a huge sum to get him out of the trouble and in return, asks him to take her into the boys hostel where he stays. Kathir finds it a fair deal and takes her into the hostel as promised. What follows is a fun ride as she gets trapped in there among the bunch of hostelites, the strict warden and his assistant Sathappan. Why Adhirshtalakshmi wanted to enter the hostel and what's so mysterious about the place form the rest of the film's story.

Cast

Soundtrack
The soundtrack and score is composed by Bobo Shashi and the album featured one song. The audio rights were acquired by Muzik 247.

Reception
The film opened to mixed reviews. Logesh Balachandran of The Times of India rated the film with 2/5 stars, stating that, "While the original had its one-liners and comedy of errors rightly placed, the remake is bit chaotic and looks like its lost in translation." Siby Jeyya of India Herald wrote, "The film, which was a smash blockbuster in Malayalam, could have been even better if it had been more subdued." Navein Darshan of Cinema Express gave the rating 1.5 out of 5 stars and called the film "a problematic dull horror comedy".Dinamalar critic gave 1.5 rating out of 5

References

External links 
 
Indian comedy horror films
Tamil remakes of Malayalam films
2022 comedy horror films
2020s Tamil-language films